Sperchopsini is a tribe in the subfamily Hydrophilinae of aquatic beetles, and it contains 24 species in 5 genera.

Genera
 Ametor
 Anticura
 Cylomissus
 Hydrocassis
 Sperchopsis

References

Polyphaga tribes
Hydrophilinae